Vasagiri Venkata Lakshminarayana popularly known as JD Lakshmi Narayana is an Indian retired police officer and politician from Andhra Pradesh. He served as the Additional Director General of Police in Mumbai, Maharashtra. He is known for leading the investigations like OMC Scandal, Emaar Properties, Y S Jagan Mohan Reddy Case, Satyam Scandal and Disproportionate Assets. He had previously held the post of Joint Commissioner of Police of Thane, Maharashtra and before that as Inspector general of police Rank under Y-category security for dealing with high-profile corruption cases. He contested from Visakhapatnam constituency in the 2019 Indian general election from Jana Sena Party. He has resigned from the Jana Sena Party in 2020.

Early life
He was born on 3 April 1965 in Kadapa Dist Andhra Pradesh and was brought up in Srisailam, Kurnool Dist, Andhra Pradesh, where his father was an Irrigation officer and mother was a School teacher . He did his Bachelor of Technology at the NIT Warangal. He did his MTech from the Indian Institute of Technology Madras. He was an Addl. Director General of Police, Maharashtra cadre from the 1990 batch of Indian Police Service. He secured all India rank 204 in Civil Services.

Career 
He worked as a Superintendent of police for Nanded and then for the Maharashtra Anti-Terrorism Squad. He was posted as Deputy inspector general of police (DIG) at Hyderabad on 12 June 2006, as he was keen to work for the CBI agency. He was initially posted as the CBI unit head for a period of five years and then given extension for two years on his promotion as the Joint Director. He successfully investigated the Satyam Scandal as a Deputy inspector general of police Rank.
As a Joint Director of CBI, he carried out Investigations of Obulapuram Mining Corporation (OMC) case and Y S Jagan Mohan Reddy's Disproportionate Assets case among other 27 high-profile cases.

He is known for his impact speeches and has interacted with more than 30 lakh youth so far. He was an active member of Lead India Foundation which was started with the blessings of Dr. APJ Abdul Kalam. Sri. V.V. Lakshmi Narayana donated blood 58 times.

Sri. V.V. Lakshmi Narayana has announced that he would adopt villages that voluntarily prohibit alcohol. Following on these lines, he has adopted three villages, Chinnamandadi of Mahabubnagar District, Sahalalaputtuga of Srikakulam District and Seetharamapuram of Vizianagaram District.

He took voluntary retirement in 2018 and extensively toured all the 13 Districts of Andhra Pradesh understanding prominent issues especially those of farmers, youth and women.

Political career
After his tour to all the Districts, he has announced that issues of farmers, youth, women would be his areas of focus, and that zero budget politics would be his primary agenda. Lakshminarayana later met with Jana Sena party president Pawan Kalyan and joined Jana Sena Party. He has contested for Visakhapatnam (Lok Sabha constituency) in the Indian General Elections – 2019. He finished the race by standing in third place. He secured 2,88, 754 votes. He resigned to Janasena party on 30 January 2020 due to some internal reasons such as the party supremo re-entry to films.

A foundation by the name Join for Development Foundation has been started under his Chairmanship and is working in the areas of Agriculture, Rural Development, Youth innovations, Environment and related areas. A Farmer Producer Organisation (FPO) has been initiated by the Foundation at Yazili, Guntur District. The temple town of Bhadrachalam has been made plastic free with the initiative of the foundation. Dr. Abdul Kalam Innovation festival has been organised and the young innovators have been suitably rewarded and felicitated.

Awards
Narayana has received the Indian police medal in 2006. He also has been awarded the Mahatma Gandhi Peace Prize by the Minority Commission of Maharashtra. He has been conferred with the Presidents Police Medal for Distinguished Services on 26 January 2017.

References

External links
 Y-Category security for CBI JD Lakshmi Narayana 
 CBI JD Lakshmi Narayana Profile (Satyam Ramalinga Raju, Y.S. Jagan, Gali Janardhana Reddy)
 ABN – Special Focus on CBI JD Lakshmi Narayana , IPS
 CBI reduces number of witnesses in Satyam case
 Top secret CBI raid traps Janardhana Reddy, Srinivasa Reddy; sleuths to now explore Jagan link
 APIIC-EMAAR Case: CBI Files Chargesheet Against IAS

Telugu people
Indian civil servants
Living people
1965 births
Indian police officers
Engineers from Andhra Pradesh
People from Kurnool district
20th-century Indian engineers
Jana Sena Party politicians